Steuben or Von Steuben most commonly refers to Friedrich Wilhelm von Steuben (1730–1794), Prussian-American military officer, or to a number of things named for him in the United States.  It may also refer to:

Places
Steuben Township, Marshall County, Illinois
Steuben County, Indiana
Steuben Township, Steuben County, Indiana
Steuben Township, Warren County, Indiana
Steuben, Maine
Steuben, New York
Steuben County, New York
Steuben Township, Crawford County, Pennsylvania
Steuben, Wisconsin

Ships
SS General von Steuben, a German auxiliary cruiser sunk in February 1945
USS Von Steuben (ID-3017), a U.S. Navy transport in World War I
USS Von Steuben (SSBN-632), an American submarine
USS Steuben County, a U.S. Navy tank landing ship in the Korean War

Other uses
Steuben Glass Works
Steuben Monument, a sculpture in Milwaukee, Wisconsin
Von Steuben Metropolitan Science Center
 German-American Steuben Parade

People with the surname
 Friedrich Wilhelm von Steuben (1730–1794), Prussian officer who aided the colonials in the American Revolutionary War
 Charles de Steuben (1788-1856), a German-born French Romantic painter and lithographer active during the Napoleonic Era.
 Fritz Steuben (1898–1981), writer
 Kuno von Steuben (1855-1935), German general in World War I

See also
Steubenville, Indiana
Steubenville, Ohio
Von Steuben Day, holiday in Baron von Steuben's honor